Austruca annulipes is a species of fiddler crab found along the coastline from South Africa to Somalia, Madagascar,  India, China, Indonesia, Malaysia and the Philippines.

Austruca annulipes was formerly in the genus Uca, but in 2016 it became a member of the genus Leptuca, a former subgenus of Uca.

They are small crabs. They are seen feeding in the evening on low tide. The males and females differ in size and appearance. The large male crabs spent the longest time excavating their burrows compared to female and smaller male Uca annulipes crabs. Males are attractive because of their bright colored front arm and movements. They are quick to hide in their burrows at the slightest hint of danger. They are prey species of house crows.

References

External links

Ocypodoidea
Crustaceans described in 1837
Taxa named by Henri Milne-Edwards